Instituto Nacional de Cancerología may refer to:

 Instituto Nacional de Cancerología (Mexico) - the Mexican National Cancer Institute
 Instituto Nacional de Cancerología (Colombia) - the Colombian National Cancer Institute